The Porter Old Meetinghouse is a historic meeting house on Old Meetinghouse Road in Porter, Maine, United States.  Built in 1818-24, it is a well-preserved example of a meeting house in rural Maine, serving as a center of local religious and civic activities.  The building was listed on the National Register of Historic Places in 1973.

Description and history
The meetinghouse is a wood frame structure, 2-1/2 stories in height, with a side gable roof and a granite foundation. The main facade first floor has doorways in the outer bays and windows on the inner bays, with sash windows in all of the remaining bays. There are also two smaller sash windows in the gable ends. The walls are clapboarded, and the roof is corrugated metal. The two doorways, each reached by granite steps, are flanked by pilasters and topped by four-light transom windows, with an entablature above.

The interior is essentially a single large chamber with a gallery on three sides.  The walls are plaster, much of it original, with trowel marks visible.  The main floor is populated with original box pews.  The pulpit is not original, having been reconstructed from plans made by the Historic American Buildings Survey in 1969, using parts from the original.

Main construction of the meetinghouse was completed in 1818-19, although it was not completely finished until 1824.  The original congregation was a Freewill Baptist organization led by Reverend Jeremiah Bullock, and were known locally as "Bullockites".  The building has also been used for municipal functions.  It is presently owned by the Town of Porter.

See also
National Register of Historic Places listings in Oxford County, Maine

References

Churches in Oxford County, Maine
Churches on the National Register of Historic Places in Maine
Churches completed in 1818
Town halls in Maine
National Register of Historic Places in Oxford County, Maine
1818 establishments in Maine